Carex annectens, sometimes called yellow-fruited fox sedge, is a species of sedge native to most of the eastern United States and southeastern Canada. It is common in prairies and high-water table fallow fields. In the Chicago area, its coefficient of conservatism is 3 (out of 10), and in Michigan, it is only 1, indicating its relatively low fidelity to high quality habitats.

Description
It is often confused with Carex vulpinoidea. It can be distinguished from C. vulpinoidea by its longer leaves (exceeding the height of the flowering stems), the more elongated perigynia, and the longer flowering spikes (often more than 5.5 cm long). Like many sedges, the perigynia of Carex annectens begin to ripen in June.

Taxonomy
It was first formally described as Carex xanthocarpa var. annectens in 1896 by American botanist Eugene P. Bicknell.

Two varieties are sometimes accepted:
 C. annectens var. annectens – large-seeded fox sedge
 C. annectens var. xanthocarpa – small-seeded fox sedge

References

annectens
Flora of North America